Carpostalagma pulverulentus is a moth of the subfamily Arctiinae. It was described by George Talbot in 1929. It is found in Kenya and Uganda.

References

Arctiini
Moths described in 1929
Moths of Africa